Japonoconger is a genus of eels in the family Congridae.

Species
There are currently three recognized species in this genus:

 Japonoconger africanus (Poll, 1953)
 Japonoconger caribbeus D. G. Smith & Kanazawa, 1977
 Japonoconger sivicolus (Matsubara & Ochiai, 1951)

References

Congridae